This is a list of railway accidents in the Netherlands, sorted chronologically.

19th century
 March 10, 1843 - During a test drive a locomotive derailed on a not well closed railway bridge near Warmond. 1 person was killed. This was the first railway accident in the Netherlands.
 August 10, 1856 - Train accident near Schiedam. A train from The Hague rammed another train which also came from The Hague and which was headed from Rotterdam. 3 persons were killed and 5 were injured, all were third class passengers.

20th century
 September 13, 1918 – Weesp train disaster, Weesp, Netherlands. Heavy rainfall caused the embankment leading to the Merwedekanaal bridge to become unstable. When a passenger train approached the bridge the track slid off the embankment, causing the carriages to crash into each other and the locomotive to hit the bridge. 41 persons were killed and 42 injured. In the aftermath of the disaster, it was decided to establish a dedicated study of soil mechanics at the Delft University of Technology.
 January 8, 1962 – The Harmelen train disaster, the deadliest railway accident in the history of The Netherlands, occurs when Leeuwarden – Rotterdam express train driver misses a warning signal in fog and passes a red signal to collide nearly head-on with another passenger train from Rotterdam to Amsterdam. 91 people (including both drivers) die, 54 are injured of which 2 lost their lives while in hospital.
 May 4, 1976 – Schiedam train disaster near Schiedam: An international train collides with a local train, killing 24 people and injuring 11.
 August 29, 1979 – Nijmegen train disaster; 8 people die when two passenger trains (one of which wasn't carrying passengers) collide head-on at Nijmegen.
 July 25, 1980 – Winsum train disaster: Two trains collide on a single track between Groningen and Roodeschool resulting in 9 deaths and 21 injured.
 December 27, 1982 - A boat train heading for Hook of Holland collides with a local train near Rotterdam. 3 people die and 20 are injured.
 November 30, 1992 – Hoofddorp train accident near Hoofddorp. An Intercity train, travelling from Amsterdam to Vlissingen derailed near Hoofddorp. Five people died, and thirty-three were injured.

21st century

2000s
 March 20, 2003 – Roermond. The driver of an NS passenger train suffers a heart attack, runs through a red signal, collides head-on with a freight train; the driver is killed, six passengers are injured seriously. After passing a distant signal at danger the automatic safety system did not enforce a deceleration large enough to prevent a collision.
 September 5, 2006 – A diesel locomotive passes a red signal and collides with a passenger train at Amersfoort. Seventeen people are injured.
 November 20, 2006 – A train passes a red signal causing a head-on collision in Rotterdam. The passenger train is empty and none are injured; there is extensive damage to the rail track and its overhead power lines.
 October 11, 2008 – Thalys trainset 4536 running between Paris and Amsterdam collide with a Koploper ICM unit near Gouda. A steam train hauled by a BR 23 2-6-2 locomotive, which had its route set into the path of the collision, makes a successful emergency stop.
 September 24, 2009 – Barendrecht train accident – Two freight trains collide head-on below a viaduct on the A15 motorway near Barendrecht, killing the driver of one train. Derailed sections land on a parallel track, where a passenger train is approaching. A few passengers of the passenger train are lightly injured.

2010s
 July 25, 2010 – The driver and a second rail worker are injured when a Speno railgrinder fails to stop in front of the buffer stop at Stavoren. A shop lying behind the track is demolished.
 January 11, 2011 – An ICE express train collides with a freight train and is derailed at Zevenaar. There are no injuries.
Three passengers are injured.
 April 21, 2012 – Sloterdijk train collision – Two trains are involved in a head-on collision between Amsterdam Centraal and Amsterdam Sloterdijk stations; one person dies, at least 117 people are injured.
 September 11, 2012 – A HTM city tram crashed into the back of another HTM city tram at an intersection near the railroad station of The Hague Hollands Spoor. Both were carrying a large number of passengers. 36 people got injured, including one of the operators.
 September 2, 2013 – The operator of an intercity train of Nederlandse Spoorwegen ignored a red light and ended up in the path of a second intercity train. The driver of the second train avoided a collision by applying the emergency brake after seeing his signal change from green to red. The official investigation concluded that after passing a yellow signal, the driver at fault applied the brakes sufficiently to satisfy the automatic control system, but not to stop before the red signal. A non-failsafe backup protection system to stop the train on approach to the red signal didn't activate as it wasn't properly configured, but wouldn't have helped anyway as the train was going too fast.
 January 15, 2014 – A passenger train from Dutch Railways derails near the central station of Hilversum. The train was carrying approx. 550 passengers. No injuries were reported.
 January 21, 2014 – An empty, out-of-service tram/LRT vehicle of HTM's Randstadrail service crashed into an in-service tram/LRT Randstadrail vehicle at a tram stop. 4 passengers were injured.
 March 17, 2014 – A tram/LRT vehicle of HTM's Randstadrail service crashes into a city tram on an intersection near the city border with Delft. 20 people are injured, one of them severely.
 March 17, 2014 – A passenger train from Syntus crashes into the trailer of a truck that got stuck at a railroad crossing near the town of Almen. The truck driver escapes just in time. 3 train passengers are injured. The train was carrying 100 people.
A few passengers suffer slight injuries.
All on board are evacuated. Twenty-four people are taken to hospital.
 February 23, 2016 – Dalfsen train crash; A passenger train collides with a crane at Dalfsen, Overijssel. The train driver was killed, six are injured.
 November 18, 2016 – A passenger train is derailed when it is in collision with a milk lorry on a level crossing at Winsum, Groningen. Eighteen people were injured, three seriously.
 April 28, 2017 – A passenger train collides with a truck on a level crossing at Wouw and is derailed, injuring the driver.
 September 20, 2018 – Oss rail accident; a passenger train collides with a Stint cart on a level crossing at Oss, killing four children and injuring two other people.
 January 11, 2019 – A passenger train collides with a truck on a level crossing in Leeuwarden, Friesland and is derailed. Six people sustain minor injuries. The truck driver had parked on the level crossing while asking for directions.

2020s
May 22, 2020 – Hooghalen train crash - collision between a train and agricultural vehicle on a level crossing in Hooghalen, Drenthe. Machinist died, two injured.
November 2, 2020 – De Akkers metro station crash - Metro train derailment caused by failure to stop at De Akkers metro station's terminus, Spijkenisse. The train crashed through a buffer stop and came to rest partially atop a whale statue erected in front of the station.
October 17, 2022 - A train collided with an abandoned broken down bus at Bergen Op Zoom level crossing. The bus driver had evacuated the bus after it stopped functioning, but was unable to prevent the collision, which split the bus and caused damage to the overhead wires.

See also
1975 Dutch train hostage crisis
1977 Dutch train hostage crisis
 Lists of rail accidents

References

Railway accidents and incidents in the Netherlands
rail
Netherlands